Alta Ribagorça is one of the comarques of Catalonia, Spain. Its capital is Pont de Suert. The highest peak is the Comaloformo (3030 metres above sea level) in the massif of Bessiberri. Northeast of the region is the western part of the Aigüestortes i Estany de Sant Maurici National Park. It is connected with the Aran valley thorough the Vielha tunnel.

The Catalan Romanesque Churches of the Vall de Boí are UNESCO World Heritage Sites. In the North-East of the area there is the Aigüestortes i Estany de Sant Maurici National Park, which attracts an important number of visitors.

The local Ribagorçan dialect is a variant of Catalan, which has some transitional traits to Aragonese.

Location:

 Farthest east point: 0° 58' 27,80" East longitude. 
 Farthest west point: 0° 41' 30,24" East longitude.
 Farthest north point: 42° 37' 58,88" North latitude.
 Farthest south point: 42° 18' 0,07" North latitude.

Highest point: Comaloformo (3030 m) in the Bessiberri Range.

Municipalities

References

External links
Official site of the Consell Comarcal of Alta Ribagorça
Information on Alta Ribagorça from the Generalitat de Catalunya
Information on Alta Ribagorça from the official site of Lleida

 
Comarques of the Province of Lleida